Moncalieri Sangone railway station serves the town and comune of Moncalieri, in the Piedmont region, northwestern Italy. The station is a through station of the Turin-Pinerolo-Torre Pellice railway.

It started to work on 27 July 1854. Since 2012 it serves line SFM2, part of the Turin metropolitan railway service.

Services

References

Railway stations in the Metropolitan City of Turin
Railway stations opened in 1854
1854 establishments in the Kingdom of Sardinia
Moncalieri